Sir Robert Charles Griggs (born 1936) is a country and jazz musician living in Hemet, CA.

History
He began his career in the 1950s as a performer on the country music television show, "Town Hall Party." Later, his career took him to Nashville where he worked in recording studios as a sideman.  In 1973, he recorded his first solo album, The Legend of Sir Robert Charles Griggs.  The album, while not a big seller and now out of print, has achieved an underground cult status.  Produced by Gary Paxton, it is an innovative showcase of experimental alt-country music, with all songs written by Griggs himself.  Moog synthesizers and sound effects on some tracks set this album apart from the rest, as being ahead of its time.

In 1968, Joe Williams recorded Griggs' song Young Man on the Way Up on the album Something Old, New, and Blue for Solid State Records, and in 1973, Dick Curless recorded Country Soul on the album The Last Blues Song.

Griggs suffered from alcoholism and became disillusioned with the recording industry, dropping out of the scene altogether.  He now lives in Hemet, California, working as a custodian at a local school.

In 2008, his second album In to Jazz was released.  It was self-released and produced by Griggs and  bassist Jim DeJulio.

External links
Recent Article about Sir Robert Charles Griggs
In to Jazz on CDBaby
In to Jazz Review from Talkin Broadway
Legend of Review from Inflight at Night

American country singer-songwriters
People from Hemet, California
Living people
1936 births
Singer-songwriters from California
Country musicians from California